This is a list of bands that play sludge metal, or sludge, a genre of heavy metal music that originated through combining elements of doom metal and hardcore punk.

List of artists

North-western sludge
 Blood Circus
 Melvins

Southern sludge 

These bands are the pioneers of the genre or are strongly influenced by those bands. Nearly all are from the Southern United States.

 16
 Acid Bath
 Buzzoven
 Cavity
 Corrosion of Conformity
 Crowbar
 Down
 Eyehategod
 Graves at Sea
 Harvey Milk
 Iron Monkey
 Mugwart
 Once Nothing
 Superjoint Ritual
 Trenches
 Thou

Stoner sludge 

These bands have mixed typical stoner rock traits with typical sludge metal traits, and may be considered a part of both genres.

 Bongzilla
 Electric Wizard
 High on Fire
 Kylesa
 Mico de Noche
 Red Fang
 Torche
 Weedeater

Other fusions with sludge metal 

 Agrimonia (sludge metal, crust punk and post-metal)
 Alice in Chains (sludge metal, grunge and alternative metal)
 Alien Boys (sludge metal grunge and doom metal)
 Baroness (sludge metal and progressive metal)
 Black Label Society (sludge metal, hard rock and Southern rock)
 Black Tusk (sludge metal, hardcore punk and stoner rock)
 Boris (sludge metal and drone metal)
 Cancer Bats (sludge metal, hardcore punk and Southern rock)
 Circle Takes the Square (sludge metal, screamo and post-hardcore)
 Converge (sludge metal, metalcore, hardcore punk) 
 Corrosion of Conformity (hardcore punk, crossover, sludge metal, Southern rock)
 Cult of Luna (sludge metal, progressive metal and post-metal)
 Dumb Numbers (sludge, doom, noise rock and "swooning feedback pop")
 Dystopia (sludge metal and crust punk)
 Fudge Tunnel (sludge metal, noise rock and alternative metal)
 Godflesh (sludge metal and industrial metal)
Grief (sludge metal, doom metal, death metal)
 Helms Alee (sludge metal and shoegaze)
 Isis (sludge metal and post-rock)
 KEN Mode (sludge metal, noise rock and post-hardcore)
 Kingdom of Sorrow (sludge metal and metalcore)
 Lair of the Minotaur (sludge metal and thrash metal)
 Mastodon (sludge metal, progressive metal, stoner rock, and alternative metal)
 Mistress (sludge metal and death metal)
 Neurosis (sludge metal and post-metal)
 Nights Like These (sludge metal and deathcore)
 Nirvana (sludge metal, punk rock, indie rock and pop)
 The Ocean (sludge metal, progressive metal and post-metal)
 Part Chimp (sludge metal and noise rock)
 Raw Radar War (sludge metal and crust punk)
 Show Me the Body (hardcore punk, noise rock, sludge metal, reggae, and alternative hip hop)
 Slugdge (blackened death metal, progressive metal, and sludge metal)
 Sofa King Killer (sludge metal, doom metal, rock and roll, and punk rock)
 Soilent Green (sludge metal and grindcore)
 Sonic Violence (sludge metal and industrial metal
 Soundgarden (sludge metal and alternative rock)
 Sumac (sludge metal and post-metal)
 Totimoshi (sludge metal and alternative rock)
 Unsane (sludge metal and noise rock)
 Weekend Nachos (sludge metal and powerviolence)
 Willard
 Will Haven (sludge metal and alternative metal)
 Whores (sludge metal and noise rock)

References 

Sludge metal musical groups
Lists of doom metal bands